In the context of transit in New York state, the Blue Line may refer to:

 The Harlem Line of the Metro-North Railroad
 The Hoboken–33rd Street route of the PATH Train
 Any of the New York City Subway services that use the IND Eighth Avenue Line and its branches:
 A Eighth Avenue Express
 C Eighth Avenue Local
 E Eighth Avenue Local
 The Rockaway Park Shuttle, which formerly contained a blue route bullet
 The former K (Eighth Avenue Local)
 The Port Jefferson Branch of the Long Island Rail Road

The following services have a light blue color:
 The former JFK Express of the New York City Subway
 The future T Second Avenue Local of the New York City Subway
 The West Hempstead Branch of the Long Island Rail Road